Joel McIlroy (born 8 August 1973 in Sydney) is an Australian actor, known for being the second actor to take on the role of Flynn Saunders, a character of the popular soap opera Home and Away. McIlroy took over the role of Flynn in 2003 after Martin Dingle-Wall left the role in 2002.

Early life
Joel McIlroy grew up in the Northern Beaches area of Sydney. McIlroy first appeared in various productions with the Forest Youth Theatre Company, acting in musicals from the age of 16 to 18. After starring in a Year 11 musical production with his high school, McIlroy decided that he wanted to become an actor. While still at school McIlroy went to the USA and studied in Los Angeles for six months. He later travelled around Europe before returning to Sydney to study acting.

At 20, McIlroy enrolled in the Australian Theatre for Young People (ATYP) and after completing four years' study has had acting roles in theatre and television ever since. McIlroy appeared in the plays, A Midsummer Night's Dream, Henry V (both by Shakespeare) and The Hour We Knew Nothing of Each Other. He worked at student jobs to support himself during those years.

Career
Many years later, he is still connected with the "Theatre for Young People." After appearing in the short film, The Beat Manifesto, for the Australian Film and Television School (North Ryde, Sydney), McIlroy was nominated for an AFI Award. He also won the Lend Lease Scholarship from the "Australian Theatre for Young People." McIlroy enrolled in a director's course with the National Institute of Dramatic Art (NIDA). His acting career spanned various plays and guest roles in television: Water Rats (1996), All Saints (1998), as Brent Duffy for four episodes of the ABC TV drama Love Is a Four-Letter Word (2001), also as Bertie Jenkins in the ABC mini series Changi (2001) and as Chook in the feature film, Angst (2000).

He also directed two Sam Shepherd plays, Action and Fool for Love.

McIlroy's acting career really took off when he joined Home and Away to replace Martin Dingle-Wall as 'Flynn Saunders'. In 2006 he was nominated for a Silver Logie Award for the most popular actor on Australian television. After becoming the husband of Sally Fletcher (Kate Ritchie), Flynn Saunders died of skin cancer, after stopping chemotherapy so he could die peacefully at home.

In 2007, he appeared in "Lion Pig Lion" at the Dunstan Playhouse in Adelaide with actress Carmel Johnson.

Arrest 
On 23 October 2019, McIlroy appeared in court after allegedly assaulting a female police officer in an unprovoked attack. In a statement, NSW Police said the 29-year-old senior constable was left with injuries to her face, neck and shoulder after she was allegedly punched repeatedly by McIlroy.

Filmography

Notes

References

External links

Joel McIlroy biography at Seven.com.au

1973 births
Living people
Australian male television actors
Male actors from Sydney
Australian male soap opera actors